Laura De Snoo (born September 21, 1962) is an American discus thrower. She was born in Fremont, California. She competed at the 1984 Summer Olympics in Los Angeles, where she placed tenth in women's discus throw.

References 

1962 births
Living people
People from Fremont, California
Athletes (track and field) at the 1984 Summer Olympics
American female discus throwers
Olympic track and field athletes of the United States
San Diego State Aztecs women's track and field athletes